I Love the Night may refer to:
"I Love the Night", a song on  Blue Öyster Cult's 1977 album Spectres
"I Love the Night", a song on Joe Cocker's 1984 album Civilized Man
"The Ecstasy of Flight (I Love the Night)", a song on Chris de Burgh's 1984 album Man on the Line

See also 
 "Love the Night", a stage piece by American playwright and actor Richard Vetere
 "I Love the Nightlife", a 1978 song by Alicia Bridges
 "Live the Night", a 2016 single by W&W and Hardwell